Thirteenth Army or 13th Army may refer to:

Thirteenth Army (Japan)
Japanese Thirteenth Area Army
13th Army (Russian Empire), unit in World War I
13th Army (RSFSR), a unit in the Russian Civil War
13th Army (Soviet Union)
13th Air Army, Soviet Union